Masel is a village development committee in Gorkha District in the Gandaki Zone of northern-central Nepal. At the time of the 2011 Nepal census it had a population of 12000+ and had 1000+ houses in the town. River Daraundi Club is local origination of city.

References

Populated places in Gorkha District